Hypostomus myersi is a species of catfish in the family Loricariidae. It is native to South America, where it occurs in the basins of the Iguazu River and the Urugua-í River. The species reaches 20.7 cm (8.1 inches) SL and is believed to be a facultative air-breather.

References 

Fish described in 1947
Hypostominae